Qalebi-ye Sofla (also Romanized as Qālebī-ye Soflá; also known as Qālebī) is a village in Veysian Rural District, Veysian District, Dowreh County, Lorestan Province, Iran. At the 2006 census, its population was 425, in 110 families.

References 

Towns and villages in Dowreh County